La Traversée de l'Atlantique (Atlantic Crossing) is a 1986 album by La Bottine Souriante.

Track listing
 "Sur le pont d'Avignon",  – 3:18
 "Le meunier et la jeune fille",  – 3:15
 "Le reel des vieux/Le reel à Jules Verret",  – 2:57
 "J'aurai le vin/Le reel du petit cheval de bois",  – 4:38
 "La belle ennuitée",  – 2:00
 "La traversée de l'Atlantique/Le set carré à Pitou Boudreault",  – 2:49
 "Le lac à Beauce / Le reel St-Jean",  – 3:45
 "La Madelon",  – 2:33
 "Le reel du mal de dos/Le reel à Jean-Marie Verret",  – 2:34
 "La Chanson des menteries",  – 4:18
 "Hommage à Philippe Bruneau / La Valse d'hiver",  – 4:18
 "La chanson des pompiers",  – 2:12

Traversee de l'Atlantique, La
Traversee de l'Atlantique, La